Orange Marangalude Veedu is a 2020 Malayalam-language film written and directed by Dr. Biju. The film stars Nedumudi Venu, P. Balachandran, Prakash Bare, Lally, Lakshmi Marikar, and Master Yedhu. The film is about a grandfather and grandson. It examines their relationship as well as agriculture, politics, communalism and other socially relevant subjects. It takes place in Thiruvananthapuram, as well as Alappuzha, Wagamon, and Nagpur. The music is by Bijibal. The film is the first Indo-Chinese co-production. It was also the debut of cinematographer Yedhu Radhakrishnan (Kannan), the son of MJ Radhakrishnan.

Cast
 Nedumudi Venu as Samuel  
 Prakash Bare as Davis
 P. Balachandran as Raju
 Master Govardhan as Steve
 Jayaram Nair
 Deepak Shivaraman
 Jayaprakash Kuloor
 Shyam Reji 
 Lally
 Lakshmi Marikar

Production
Production was done by Studio Media.

Awards and recognition
The film was selected for the Indian Film Festival of Cincinnati in 2021.

It was also selected for the 24th Kolkata International Film Festival.

References

External links
 

2020 films
2020s Malayalam-language films
Films scored by Bijibal
2020s English-language films